The National Museum of Somaliland is a national museum in Hargeisa, the capital of Somaliland.

Gallery

See also
 Hargeisa
 List of museums in Somaliland

References

External links

Museums established in 2019
Museums in Somaliland
Somaliland